HQAC may refer to:

Headquarters Air Command of the following air forces:
RAF Air Command (Royal Air Force)
RAAF Air Command (Royal Australian Air Force)
Headquarters Air Cadets, a British youth organisation sponsored by the Ministry of Defence and the Royal Air Force